is a Japanese high school and junior high school located in Kōto, Kamigōri, Akō District, Hyōgo, Japan, in Harima Science Garden City.

School motto 

Extracurricular activities

Junior high school

Sports 
Athletics
Kendo
Basketball
Table tennis (new in 2016)

Cultural activities 
Natural science
Japanese tea ceremony
English Speaking Society
Fine arts (new in 2016)

Other 
Student council

High school

Sports 

Athletics
Swimming
Kendo
Soccer
Baseball
Table tennis
Basketball
Badminton
Tennis

Cultural activities 

Natural science
Astronomy Group
Biology Group
Chemistry Group
Physics Group
Japanese tea ceremony and Ikebana
English Speaking Society
Broadcasting
Literature
Music
Computer

Other 
Student council

Sister schools

Willetton Senior High School, Australia
Cultural exchanges started in 1995, and a collaborative international partnership was established in 2005.

Masan Happo High School, Korea
A collaborative international partnership was established in 2007.

Triam Udom Suksa School, Thailand 
Cultural exchanges started in 2001, and a collaborative international partnership was established in 2009.

See also 
University of Hyogo
Secondary education in Japan

References

External links 
The Junior High School of University of Hyogo 
The High School of University of Hyogo 
University of Hyogo

Education in Japan
High schools in Hyōgo Prefecture
Schools in Hyōgo Prefecture
1994 establishments in Japan
2007 establishments in Japan
Harima Science Garden City